

Works
 Jacob van Maerlant writes his last poem Van den Lande van Oversee after the fall of Acre, Israel

Births
 Philippe de Vitry (died 1361), French composer, music theorist and poet

Deaths
 Saadi Shirazi, Persian (est. - some sources suggest as early as 1283)

References 

13th-century poetry
Poetry